Eucalyptus obtusiflora, commonly known as Dongara mallee, is a species of mallee that is endemic to Western Australia. It has smooth greyish or brownish bark that is often imperfectly shed, lance-shaped to curved adult leaves, flower buds usually in groups of seven or nine, creamy white flowers and cup-shaped, conical or barrel-shaped fruit.

Description
It has smooth, greyish or brownish bark that is often imperfectly shed on the lower half of the stems. It blooms between January and May producing white or creamy white flowers.

Taxonomy and naming
Eucalyptus obtusiflora was first formally described in 1828 by Augustin Pyramus de Candolle in his treatise, Prodromus Systematis Naturalis Regni Vegetabilis. The specific epithet (obtusiflora) is from the Latin obtusus meaning "obtuse" or "blunt" and -florus meaning "-flowered", referring to the bluntness of the operculum, although that structure is not always blunt.

The name Eucalyptus obtusiflora has been applied to both a Western Australian species and to a species known in New South Wales as Port Jackson mallee, as for example in Flora of Australia. According to Dean Nicolle, Alex George and Peter G. Wilson, this situation arose because of confusion about the type material. The eastern Australian species is now considered to be Eucalyptus obstans, recognised by the Australian Plant Census (APC), as a synonym of E. burgessiana.

Three subspecies are recognised by the APC:
 Eucalyptus obtusiflora subsp. cowcowensis L.A.S.Johnson & K.D.Hill;
 Eucalyptus obtusiflora subsp. dongarraensis (Maiden & Blakely) L.A.S.Johnson & K.D.Hill;
 Eucalyptus obtusiflora DC. subsp. obtusiflora.

Distribution and habitat
The Dongara mallee is found in interdunal hollows between Jurien Bay and Moora in the south of its range to Gnaraloo in the north, and inland to Wubin, Wyalkatchem and Corrigin. It grows in sandy-loam soils.

See also
List of Eucalyptus species

References

Eucalypts of Western Australia
obtusiflora
Myrtales of Australia
Plants described in 1828
Taxa named by Augustin Pyramus de Candolle